Arnaoutigitonia (or Arnaout) is a district of the Municipality of Limassol. In 2019 the Cyprus Republic published which areas of the mainly Turkish-Cypriot owned Arnaoutogeitonia will be used for public interests.

Location 
To the west it borders with Agios Ioannis, to the north and east with Katholiki, to the southeast and south with the Tzami Tzentit  and to the southwest with Tsiflikoudia.

History 
The district got its name from the Turkish word Arnaout, which means Albanian. The district had a significant population of Turkish-Albanians brought by the Ottomans in the 19th century to establish a colony. Either by mistake or for reasons of convenience, the Greek Cypriots called the whole district Arnaout or Arnaoudkia. The district is built around the Arnaut Mosque of Limassol. In the district there were handicrafts and workshops, cafes and sports clubs, as well as a winter cinema.

References

Communities in Limassol District